Saksağan, Lalapaşa
 Saksağan, mountain (:az:Sağsağan (dağ))
 Saksağan Kalesi